Coed Hills Rural Artspace is situated close to the village of St Hilary in the Vale of Glamorgan, approximately  west of Cardiff.

We have an 8-acre market garden and a 2-acre forest garden on site, and host conferences, courses and events. They run a selection of courses for the 'Growing the Future' scheme along with a wide number of events, including private hire for a number of purposes such as weddings. The site is seasonally open to visitors and guided tours, and provides an educational resource via workshops that are run for schools, colleges and groups.

For other similar communities in the UK see: Diggers and Dreamers

External links 
 Coed Hills Rural Artspace
 Coed Hills Forest Garden Project
 Riverside Market Garden
 Whale and Yurts in Green Art Show (BBC News)
 Arts Council of Wales

Vale of Glamorgan
Intentional communities in the United Kingdom
1997 establishments in the United Kingdom
Event venues established in 1997